Agrate may refer to the following places in Italy:

Agrate Brianza, comune in the Province of Monza and Brianza
Agrate Conturbia, comune in the Province of Novara